American Dream is the ninth album by the band Crosby, Stills & Nash, their fifth studio album and their second with Neil Young. Released in 1988 on Atlantic Records, it peaked at No. 16 on the Billboard 200 and has been certified platinum by the Recording Industry Association of America. To date, it is their final album of original material to receive either a gold or platinum citation by the RIAA. It is the highest-selling album by Neil Young in the 1980s. The album is dedicated to Jan Crosby, Anne Stills, Susan Nash and Pegi Young.

Background
Neil Young promised David Crosby in 1983 that he would reunite with Crosby, Stills & Nash if Crosby could solve his problems with drugs and clean himself up. Five months in prison in 1986 for Crosby at the Texas Department of Corrections in Huntsville following his 1985 arrest for possession of illegal drugs and a semi-automatic firearm in West Palm Beach, Florida accomplished exactly that, and good to Young's word the quartet assembled to record the second official CSNY studio album at Young's ranch in Woodside, California with his handpicked production team.

The title song, written by Neil Young, was a satire of sensational political scandals involving Oliver North, former presidential candidate Gary Hart and televangelist Jimmy Swaggart, and was promoted with a filmed music video that featured members of the band portraying exaggerated caricatures of North, Hart, and Swaggart with a disguised Young acting as narrator to their "downfall". Released as a single, it missed the Billboard Hot 100 completely, as did three of the other four singles released from the album. The only single to chart, "Got It Made", peaked at No. 69 on the Hot 100, though it charted much higher on two format-specific Billboard charts— #11 on Adult Contemporary and #1 on Album Rock Tracks (now Mainstream Rock).

Recording
David Crosby recounted, "The whole thing, the recording of American Dream, it got stretched out. And we did not have, really, the best group of songs to work with. Then, even though we did not have enough good songs, we ended up putting fourteen of them on the album! I think that was stupid." For the first time in the group's history, none of the songs from a studio album became standard items in the group's live repertoire.

Reception

Writing in Rolling Stone, critic Anthony DeCurtis wrote that "Despite pleasant melodies, the occasional interesting song, and the signature harmonies, American Dream is, for the most part, a snoozefest."

The album was voted number 614 in the second edition of Colin Larkin's All Time Top 1000 Albums (1998).

Cash Box called the title track "the best thing out of CSN or Y since Deja Vu."

Track listing

Side one

Side two

Personnel

CSNY 
 David Crosby – backing vocals, lead vocals (6, 11), acoustic guitar (9, 11)
 Stephen Stills – backing vocals, keyboards (1, 2), lead vocals (2, 8, 10, 14), electric guitar (3, 4, 6, 8-10, 14), synth bass (4), guitar solo (6), percussion (8), acoustic guitar (12), synthesizers (14), bass (14), handclaps (14)
 Graham Nash – backing vocals, lead vocals (4, 7, 9, 12), acoustic piano (4), electric guitar (6), keyboards (9)
 Neil Young – backing vocals, lead vocals (1, 3, 5, 8, 13, 14), electric guitar (1-10, 12, 14), percussion (3, 13), additional acoustic piano (4), all instruments (5), harmonica (11), acoustic guitar (13)

Additional personnel 
 Brian Bell – synthesizer programming (5)
 Mike Finnigan – Hammond B3 organ (6), keyboards (12), additional vocals (12)
 Rhett Lawrence – synthesizer programming (12)
 Bob Glaub – bass (1-3, 6, 8-10, 12)
 Joe Vitale – drums (1-4, 6, 8, 9, 14), synthesizers (4), all instruments (7), additional vocals (7), percussion (8, 13), keyboards (9-12), vibraphone (13)
 Chad Cromwell – drums (10)
 Joe Lala – percussion (2, 7, 9, 10), drums (12)
 The Bluenotes – horns (10):
 Larry Cragg – saxophones 
 Steve Lawrence – saxophones 
 Claude Callilet – trombone 
 Tommy Bray – trumpet 
 John Fumo – trumpet 

Handclaps on "American Dream"
 Niko Bolas, Tim Mulligan, Tim Foster and Brentley Walton

Sound effects on "Shadowland"
 Bill Boydston, Don Gooch, Bill Lazerus, Graham Nash and Joe Vitale

The Volume Dealers Choir on "Soldiers of Peace"
 Kelly Ashmore, Betsy Aubrey, Tom Banghart, Cha Blevins, Niko Bolas, Craig Doerge, Scott Gordon, R. Mac Holbert, Stanley Johnston, Bill Krause, Debbie Meister, Tim Mulligan, Susan Nash, Jay Parti, Steve Perry, Vince Slaughter, Joe Vitale and Paul Williamson

Production 
 Crosby, Stills, Nash & Young – producers, mixing 
 Niko Bolas – producer, recording, mixing 
 Tim Mulligan – assistant producer, recording, mixing, digital editing 
 Gary Long – engineer 
 Tim McColm – engineer 
 Brentley Walton – engineer
 Tom Banghart – mix assistant 
 Bob Vogt – mix assistant 
 Bill Dooley – digital editing 
 Bob Ludwig – mastering at Masterdisk (New York City, New York)
 Gary Burden – art direction, design
 Henry Diltz – back cover photography
 Aaron Rapoport – front cover photography
 Delana Bettoli – border illustration

Charts 

Year-end charts

Certifications

References

1988 albums
Crosby, Stills, Nash & Young albums
Atlantic Records albums
Albums produced by Niko Bolas
Albums produced by Neil Young
Albums produced by Graham Nash
Albums produced by David Crosby
Albums produced by Stephen Stills
Albums recorded at A&M Studios
Albums recorded in a home studio